The First Snows of 2002 (2002年的第一場雪) is the 2003 album by Han Chinese singer Dao Lang.

Track listing

 2002年的第一場雪 (The First Snows of 2002) 
 新阿瓦爾古麗 (HAWAGUL) 
 新疆好 (The Wonderful Xinjiang) 
 薩拉姆毛主席 (Our Dear Chairman Mao) 
 艾里莆与赛乃姆 (HERIP and SANAM) 
 情人 (Lover)
 草原之夜 (Night of Grassland)
 祝酒歌 (Song of Toast)
 敖包相会 (Ao Bao Rendezvous)
 雨中飘荡的回忆 (Memories in the Rain) 4:16
 駝鈴 (Camel Bell) 4:47
 冲动的惩罚 (The Punishment of Impulsiveness)

Sources 

2003 albums